Masoud is a given name and surname, with origins in Persian and Arabic. The name is found in the Arab world, Iran, Turkey, Tajikistan, Afghanistan, Uzbekistan, Pakistan, Russia, India, Bangladesh, Malaysia, and China. Masoud has spelling variations possibly due to transliteration, including Masud, Massoud, Massoude, Massudeh, Masood, Masʽud, Mashud, Messaoud, Mesut, Mesud, or Mosād.

Given name

Masoud 
 Masoud Kazerouni, 14th-Century Persian physician
 Masoud Barzani, President of the Iraqi Kurdistan region
 Masoud (musician), Iranian music producer, artist, and DJ
 Masoud Shojaei, Iranian footballer
 Masoud Bastani, Iranian journalist

Mas'ud 

 Masud I of Ghazni, sultan of the Ghaznavid Empire from 1030 to 1040
 Masud Hai Rakkaḥ, Chief rabbi of Tripoli

Other variations of spellings 
 Messaoud Bellemou, Algerian musician
 Messaoud Ould Boulkheir, Mauritanian politician
 Moshood K. O. Abiola, late politician and philanthropist from Nigeria
 Masood Sharif Khan Khattak, Civilian intelligence officer
Mesut Özil, German footballer of Turkish descent

Surname

Masoud 

 Moez Masoud, Moderate Egyptian Muslim cleric

Masood 

 Shan Masood, Pakistani cricketer
Syed M. Masood, Pakistani-American author

Other variations of spellings 
 Rükneddin Mesud, King Mesud I
 Mohamed Messaoud, Algerian footballer

Fictional characters 
 Masud Rana, fictional character of popular Bengali spy thriller series of the same name
 Masood Ahmed, fictional character in EastEnders, and his family, including:
Zainab Masood, fictional character
Syed Masood, fictional character
Amira Masood, fictional character
Shabnam Masood, fictional character
Tamwar Masood, fictional character
Afia Masood, fictional character
Kamil Masood, fictional character
Yasmin Masood, fictional character

Arabic given names
Arabic-language surnames
Persian given names
Persian-language surnames